The  is a railway line in Japan linking Kōma Station in Morioka, Iwate Prefecture and Ōdate Station in Ōdate, Akita Prefecture, Japan. The line extends 106.9 km (66.4 mi) with a total of 27 stations.

Stations 

Legend
◇, ∨, ∧ - Trains can pass each other at this station
◆ - Trains can pass each other at this switchback
｜ - Trains cannot pass

History

The Japanese Government Railways (JGR) opened the Kōma to Tairadate section on 27 August 1922, and extended the line in sections from November 1926, reaching Rikuchu-Osato on 17 October 1931.

See also
List of railway lines in Japan

References

 
Lines of East Japan Railway Company
Rail transport in Iwate Prefecture
Rail transport in Akita Prefecture
1067 mm gauge railways in Japan
Railway lines opened in 1914